Jumadurdy Garaýew (10 January 1910 –  4 May 1960) was a Soviet politician who served as the first secretary of the Communist Party of Turkmenistan from 14 December 1958 until his death on 4 May 1960.

Notes

References
 Rulers of Soviet Republics

1910 births
1960 deaths
Soviet politicians
People from Mary Region
People from Transcaspian Oblast
First secretaries of the Communist Party of Turkmenistan
Heads of government of the Turkmen Soviet Socialist Republic
Third convocation members of the Supreme Soviet of the Soviet Union
Fourth convocation members of the Supreme Soviet of the Soviet Union
Fifth convocation members of the Supreme Soviet of the Soviet Union
People's commissars and ministers of the Turkmen Soviet Socialist Republic
Recipients of the Order of Lenin
Recipients of the Order of the Red Banner of Labour